Laureal is a settlement in Guadeloupe in the commune of Le Moule, on the island of Grande-Terre.  It is located to the south of Lemercier, Le Moule, and Conchou, and to the north of Fonds d'Or, Boisvin, Renard, and Gardel.

Populated places in Guadeloupe